Zdzisław Kostrzewa (26 October 1955 – 20 May 1991) was a Polish footballer. During his club career, he won the Polish Cup back-to-back in 1977 and 1978 with Zaglebie Sosnowiec. In 1987 he claimed the Victorian State League championship with Maribyrnong Polonia.

He was buried in Wiliamstown Cemetery. He played for the Poland national football team and participated in the 1978 FIFA World Cup.

References

1955 births
1991 deaths
Polish footballers
Poland international footballers
1978 FIFA World Cup players
Zagłębie Sosnowiec players
Śląsk Wrocław players
Sportspeople from Wrocław
Association football goalkeepers
Western Eagles FC players